Pornotopia is an idea in critical theory describing an imagined space determined by fantasies and dominated by human sexual activity, expressed in and encompassing pornography and erotica. The word was coined by American literary critic Steven Marcus in his 1966 book The Other Victorians, deriving inspiration from nineteenth-century English literature on sexuality by moralists, physicians and erotic authors.

American sociologist Daniel Bell expounded on the idea, viewing the promotion and enforcement of enjoyment in late capitalism as the ground for society's pornotopia, paradoxically going against the bourgeois virtues of sobriety, chastity and purity that the system of capitalism was historically built alongside.

Structure 
A pornotopia is characterized by its freedom from the normal social restraints of place and time ingrained by the Real, instead orienting around unconscious laws of enjoyment. Steven Marcus summarized this aspect with the principle that "it is always summertime in pornotopia". Barriers to enjoyment and subsequently liberated sexuality are either split off entirely, or dissolved through an excess of sexual activity, provoking jouissance.

In pornotopias, narrative flows are suspended on a tenuous line; examples include picaresque novels allowing for multiple encounters, and Sadean novels with multiplications of all possible combinations of persons and their orifices. Marcus argued that because of the freedom offered by the enjoyment of pornography that paradoxically traps subjects in its enjoyment, besides the orgasm, "it is an end, a conclusion of any kind, that pornography most resists". For example, Susan Sontag singled out Catherine Robbe-Grillet's 1956 novel The Image as transcending its genre because its conclusion retrospectively illuminates the novel's sadomasochistic events and leaves them in a suspense that suggests limitless continuation, which is a key component of a pornotopia.

Characterization 
In a pornotopia, characters are typically hypersexual, forever ready for sex with an almost omnipotent capacity for libido, renewal and further activity, evoking freedom from external reality and timelessness. In this sense, they can often be invulnerable; for example, in Anne Desclos' 1954 novel Story of O, the novel's central metaphor demonstrates that just as the chains never rust in her fairytale-style château, the inhabitants are never damaged by their ordeals, and never lose any of their allure. This capacity of the novel, and of pornotopias in general, to allow the enjoyment of the Imaginary to overtake the reality principle was observed by Jacques Lacan, saying that "whatever happens to the subject is incapable of spoiling the image in question, incapable even of wearing it out".

Criticism 
Following the publication of The Other Victorians, historian Brian Harrison criticized Steven Marcus' concept of pornotopia for what he saw as a biased use of literary sources. From Harrison's analysis, Marcus exclusively drew on a small number of Victorian texts oriented around sexuality, from which he developed a lengthy conceptual conclusion about the intents and drives of pornography in general. In 2017, literary critic Thomas Joudrey, drawing on the same archive that Marcus had examined at the Kinsey Institute, also challenged the concept of pornotopia by calling attention to the equally pervasive presence of bodily failure, decay, suffering and death in Victorian pornographic novels, appearing as impotence, castration, torn foreskins, slack vaginas, incontinence and syphilitic outbreaks, although this could also be taken as transgressive enjoyment. Joudrey further challenged the concept of pornotopia by drawing attention to extensive political commentary in pornographic magazines such as The Pearl, including references to the Reform Bills and Contagious Diseases Acts, in addition to many controversial public figures, including Annie Besant, Charles Spurgeon, Wilfrid Lawson, Newman Hall, Edmund Burke, William Gladstone, and Robert Peel, where such a space of liberated and limitless sexuality is implausible against the social demands of non-sexual activity.

See also 
 Assemblage
 Cornucopia
 Escapism
 Jouissance
 Pastoral
 Raunch culture
 Repressive desublimation
 Saturnalia
 Sentimentalism
 Sexual fantasy
 Utopia

References

Further reading

External links
 The Victorian Pornotopia

Erotic fiction
Pornography
Sexual revolution
Critical theory
Literary concepts
Philosophy of sexuality